Van Blarcom House, is located in Wyckoff, Bergen County, New Jersey, United States. The house was built in 1740 by Peter Van Blarcom and was added to the National Register of Historic Places on January 10, 1983. The house is considered a sister house to the nearby Terhune House.

See also
National Register of Historic Places listings in Bergen County, New Jersey

References

Houses completed in 1740
Houses on the National Register of Historic Places in New Jersey
Houses in Bergen County, New Jersey
National Register of Historic Places in Bergen County, New Jersey
Wyckoff, New Jersey
New Jersey Register of Historic Places
1740 establishments in New Jersey